Dier or DIER may refer to:

People
 Brett Dier (born 1990), Canadian actor
 Dirk Dier (born 1972), German tennis player
 Eric Dier (born 1994), English footballer
 Richard A. Dier (1914–1972), American judge
 Tobias Dier (born 1976), German golfer

Other
 Department of Infrastructure, Energy and Resources, a former department of the Tasmanian government
 Wakker Dier, Dutch animal welfare organisation
 Department for Industrial & Employment Relations of Malta

See also
 Dyer (disambiguation)